Roger Murray-Leach (born 25 June 1943) is a British Production Designer possibly best known for his work on British television series' Doctor Who and Blake's 7 in the 1970s, although he then went on to work on major feature films.

Initially training to be an architect, he joined the BBC design department in 1966, quickly gaining a reputation for great imagination and flair. He began working on Doctor Who when Philip Hinchcliffe took over as producer in late 1974. Hinchcliffe's vision for the series included giving a high priority to set design and he quickly realised that Murray-Leach was one of the most, if not the most, imaginative and resourceful designers on the BBC staff. Murray-Leach designed several Doctor Who serials under Hinchcliffe's reign, many of which remain amongst the most popular serials in the show's history. For the serial Planet of Evil, Murray-Leach designed an alien jungle at Ealing studios that so impressed Hinchcliffe that he wrote to the Head of the BBC design department, suggesting that Murray-Leach should be nominated for a BAFTA or a Royal Television Society Award.

David Maloney, a director who had worked on a number of the Doctor Who serials designed by Murray-Leach, went on to produce Blake's 7 for the BBC and immediately secured the services of Murray-Leach as lead designer, which included both the exterior and interior of the Liberator spacecraft.

In 1980, following his work on Langrishe Go Down, starring Judi Dench and Jeremy Irons, and Speed King starring Robert Hardy as Sir Malcom Campbell, Murray-Leach left the BBC to work on the 1981 series Winston Churchill: The Wilderness Years for which he was nominated for a BAFTA award.  His talent was finally being recognised and he broke into feature films, working as production designer on Local Hero. Following this his credits include A Christmas Carol with George C Scott as Scrooge, Defence of the Realm, Clockwise, A Fish Called Wanda, and Goldeneye. His movie career extended into the 1990s with, among others, Mrs Harris Goes To Paris, The Mighty Quinn, Twenty-One and Fierce Creatures. In 1983 he was also employed as Art Director on The Killing Fields.

In recent years he has designed several small films for director Norman Stone - Beyond Narnia, Florence Nightingale, KJV, Whistler and The Most Reluctant Convert - as well as working on the development of further projects. He has appeared in a number of television and DVD documentaries discussing his work on Doctor Who, including A Darker Side, a retrospective feature included in the 2|entertain/BBC DVD release of Planet of Evil, in which he and Hinchcliffe returned to Ealing studios to discuss the story's design and production.

In the early 2000s, he co-founded the Fishworks restaurant chain alongside Mitch Tonks.

He lives in Henley-on-Thames, England.

External links

Living people
British film designers
1943 births
Place of birth missing (living people)